Bob Dunlop (born 8 December 1935) is a former Australian rules footballer who played with Essendon in the Victorian Football League (VFL). He won Essendon's best first year player award in 1960 before returning to his original side, Rupanyup, in 1962.

Notes

External links 
		

Essendon Football Club past player profile

1935 births
Living people
Australian rules footballers from Victoria (Australia)
Essendon Football Club players
Rupanyup Football Club players